Barsine flammealis is a moth of the family Erebidae. It was described by Frederic Moore in 1878. It is found in China, India and Nepal.

References

Moths of Asia
Nudariina

Moths described in 1878